Martin Mesík (born 17 October 1979) is a Slovak former ski jumper who holds the Slovak national record with 195.5 m which he set at Kulm in February 2005. Mesík first competed at World Cup level in the 1995–96 season, and was for a long time the only Slovak ski jumper; he also had to train by himself. In 2007 he was joined by countryman Tomáš Zmoray. Mesík retired from ski jumping a year later and currently lives in Selce. During his active career he was 183 cm tall, and his weight was 64 kg.

He has competed twice in the Winter Olympics, nine times at the World Championships, and 90 times in the World Cup. His best World Cup placement was 16th place at Willingen in 2003. In the World Ski Championships in Trondheim 1997 he ended up on 20th place in the Large Hill competition.

References

1979 births
Sportspeople from Banská Bystrica
Slovak male ski jumpers
Olympic ski jumpers of Slovakia
Ski jumpers at the 1998 Winter Olympics
Ski jumpers at the 2006 Winter Olympics
Living people